Leigh Austen Wiener (August 25, 1929 - May 11, 1993) was an American photographer and photojournalist. In a career that spanned five decades, he covered hundreds of people and events. His images captured the public and private moments of entertainers, musicians, artists, authors, poets, scientists, sports figures, politicians, industrialists, and heads of state, including every U.S. president from Harry Truman to Ronald Reagan and illustrated every sector of industry including farming, steel mills, auto manufacturing, aerospace, medicine, research, early computing and semi-conductor manufacturing.

Biography
Leigh A. Wiener was born in New York City to Grace and Willard Wiener. Wiener's lifelong love of cameras and photography began at an early age. Willard Wiener was a newspaper man who frequently brought family friend and colleague Arthur Fellig—the news photographer better known as Weegee—to the house for Sunday dinner. Felig always had a packet of his latest pictures with him which he would lay out, asking a young Leigh for his opinion. By the age of 14, Wiener sold his first commercial photograph to Collier’s Weekly.

In 1946, he moved to Los Angeles. While attending UCLA, where he majored in Political Science, Wiener also worked as a news photographer for The Los Angeles Times. After college, he joined the Times as a staff photographer, but his years there were interrupted by military service in Europe as an Army photographer for Stars and Stripes.

Career turning point
On April 8, 1949 in San Marino, California, three-year-old Kathy Fiscus, while playing in a field with three other children, fell down an abandoned well, only fourteen inches wide, and became wedged ninety-seven feet below the ground.

Arriving on the scene, Wiener came upon hundreds of other newspeople, photographers, and television crews. Believing there was little else at the scene that could be photographed, Wiener left the field and walked to the Fiscus home. There in the rear yard, using his 4x5 Speed Graphic, he photographed the child's empty swing.

Returning to the scene, Wiener waited along with everyone else. Despite the efforts of the rescue teams to reach her, Kathy's lifeless body was brought up two days later. Subsequently, Wiener's powerful photograph of the child's empty swing was used on the front page of over 150 newspapers nationwide.

Work
During his decades-long career as a photographer and photojournalist, Wiener consistently produced front-page pictures and photo essays for the world's most prestigious newspapers and news magazines such as Life, Paris-Match, Fortune, Time, The Saturday Evening Post and Sports Illustrated.

Wiener formed his own company in 1958. He became noted for his innovative combination of cameras and lenses; setups he designed himself to achieve the images he desired.

When photographing people, Wiener had the keen ability to capture the context of the moment while focusing squarely on the subject, inherently isolating the essential from the non-essential; the emotional state of the subject at the precise moment of the shutter-click expressed. This was the hallmark of his work.

On assignment for Life during the 1960 presidential primaries he would capture iconic images of John F. Kennedy and Lyndon B. Johnson. He extensively documented Kennedy's bid for the presidency when the senator retained him to record his campaign. Wiener traveled with Kennedy on the campaign trail through the Pacific Northwest.

He later expanded into the world of TV documentaries. The Eddy Award-winning “A Slice of Sunday” was his 1967 production on professional football shot with camera-optical systems of his own design. It would serve as the prototype for many of the sports programs on network television in the years to follow such as The NFL Today. In 1979, the Motion Picture Editors Guild recognized it as one of the three most innovative documentaries in the prior 25 years of broadcasting.

In 1975, Wiener created and produced the Emmy award-winning NBC-TV series “Talk About Pictures.” He co-hosted the program with George Fenneman. The series featured an eclectic cross-section of photographers and photo enthusiasts exploring photographs and photography. Guests included professionals such as Ansel Adams, Alfred Eisenstaedt, Edmund Teske, and Mario Casilli and buffs such as Edgar Bergen, Betty White, Richard Chamberlain, David Cassidy and Bob Crane.

In considering the decisive moment, he said:

In 1987 he was selected by the Vatican to photograph Pope John Paul II's visit to Los Angeles during his trip to the United States.

He produced nine books including Here Comes Me, Marilyn: A Hollywood Farewell; The Death and Funeral of Marilyn Monroe, How Do You Photograph People?, and Tijuana Sunday.

Wiener's work has been spotlighted in photographic art circles, viewed in solo and group exhibitions in museums and galleries across the U.S. Four of his photographs – of Sandy Koufax, Willie Mays, President John F. Kennedy, and Sidney Poitier — were acquired by the National Portrait Gallery in Washington.

He taught classes in photography at UCLA, and held lectures and seminars in the U.S. and abroad.

Death
Leigh Wiener died on May 11, 1993, in Los Angeles after suffering a long illness. His obituary published in The New York Times following his death, described him as photographer of the famous and historic.  He died from complications of Sweet's syndrome, a skin disease. His doctors attributed the disease possibly to radiation exposure he received while photographing atomic isotopes and atomic bomb tests in the Nevada-Utah desert and in the Pacific after World War II for Life magazine.

Bibliography
 1966: Here Comes Me, Odyssey Press
 1969: Not Subject To Change, IBM Corporation
 1982: How Do You Photograph People, The Viking Press
 1986: Limited Edition Portfolio on Poet William Everson, Murray J. Smith/The Dawson's Book Shop
 1987: Leigh Wiener: Portraits, 7410 Publishing, Inc.
 1989: Tijuana Sunday, 7410 Publishing, Inc.
 1990: Marilyn: A Hollywood Farewell, 7410 Publishing, Inc.
 2006: Johnny Cash: Photographs by Leigh Wiener, Five Ties Publishing
 2012: Alcatraz: The Last Day, Golden Gate National Parks Conservancy

Books containing his works
 1964: Industrial Design: Volume 5, by Henry Dreyfuss
 1965: The Drug Takers, Time-Life Books
 1968: The Selected Letters of Robinson Jeffers, by Ann Ridgeway and Leigh Wiener, The Johns Hopkins Press
 1969: UCLA on The Move, by Andrew Hamilton and John B. Jackson, The Ward Ritchie Press
 1973: The Best of LIFE, Time Inc.
 1975: LIFE Goes To The Movies, Time Inc.
 1975: Rainbow, by Christopher Finch, Grossett and Dunlap
 1976: Violence and Aggression, by Ronald H. Bailey, Time-Life Books
 1977: The Double Ax, by Robinson Jeffers, Liveright
 1977: Dear Judas and Other Poems by Robinson Jeffers, by Robinson Jeffers, Liveright
 1977: The Women at Point Sur and Other Poems, by Robinson Jeffers, Liveright
 1982: Judy and Liza, by James Spada, Doubleday and Co., Inc.
 1983: The Cliffs of Solitude, by Robert Zaller, Cambridge University Press
 1985: Jubal Sackett, by Louis L'Amour, Bantam Books
 1987: Robinson Jeffers, by Unterjochte Erde, R. Piper Gmb.H & Co.
 1987: Robinson Jeffers, Poet, by Robert J. Brophy
 1987: Fine Printing: The Los Angeles Tradition, by Ward Ritchie
 1987: Masters of Starlight: Photographers in Hollywood, by David Fahey and Linda Rich
 1988: Photography For The Art Market, by Kathryn Marx, Amphoto
 1988: William Everson: The Life of Brother Antoninus by Lee Bartlett, A New Directions Book
 2000: One Man's Eye: Photographs from the Alan Siegel Collection, Word Wise Press
 2002: A Life in the Golden Age of Jazz: A Biography of Buddy DeFranco, by Fabrice Zammarchi and Sylvie Mas, Parkside Publications, Inc.
 2007: Frank Sinatra: My Way Of Life, Sinatra Society of Japan, Dank
 2008: This Side of Paradise, Jennifer A. Watts and Claudia Bohn-Spector, Merrell
 2009: Los Angeles: Portrait of a City, by David L. Ulin and Kevin Starr, TASCHEN
 2009: Against The Eternal Yesterday: Essays Commemorating The Legacy Of Lion Feuchtwanger, Figueroa Press
 2011: Dennis Hopper: Photographs 1961-1967, by Dennis Hopper, Victor Bockris, Walter Hopps, Jessica Hundley, Tony Shafrazi, TASCHEN
 2014: Hollywood Digs: An Archaeology of Shadows, by Ken LaZebnik, Kelly's Cove Press

Exhibitions
 1975: Ray Cummings Gallery
 1975: Gallery On The Plaza, The New England Institute of Art, Brookline, MA, USA
 1977: Moody Gallery, Houston, TX, USA
 1978: Living Room Gallery
 1981: Realities Gallery, Melbourne, Australia
 1983: Carol Schlosberg Gallery, Montserrat College of Art, Beverley, MA, USA
 1985: Zeitlin & Ver Brugge Gallery, Los Angeles, CA, USA
 1986: Irvine Fine Arts Center, Irvine, CA, USA
 1987: Downey Museum of Art, Downey, CA, USA
 1987: Witkin Gallery, New York, NY, USA
 1987: Valerie Miller Gallery
 1987: California State University at Long Beach Gallery, Long Beach, CA, USA
 1987: Santa Barbara Museum of Art, Santa Barbara, CA, USA
 1987: Arpel Gallery, Santa Barbara, CA, USA
 1987: Zeitlin & Ver Brugge Gallery, Los Angeles, CA, USA
 1987: Bowers Museum, Santa Ana, CA, USA
 1988: California State University at Long Beach Gallery, Long Beach, CA, USA
 1998: The Craig Krull Gallery, Santa Monica, CA, USA
 2001: Academy of Motion Picture Arts and Sciences, Beverly Hills, CA, USA
 2006: The Craig Krull Gallery, Santa Monica, CA, USA
 2009: The Ordover Gallery at the San Diego Museum of Natural History, San Diego, CA, USA
 2010: Monroe Gallery, Santa Fe, NM, USA
 2013: Alcatraz Island, San Francisco, CA, USA

Group exhibitions - partial listing
 1987: Museum of The Borough of Brooklyn, Brooklyn College, Brooklyn, NY, USA
 1988: Los Angeles County Museum of Art, Los Angeles, CA, USA
 1988: University of Judaism, Los Angeles, CA, USA
 1988: Art Institute of Boston, Boston, MA, USA
 1997: The Witkin Gallery, New York City, NY USA
 2008: The Huntington, San Marino, CA, USA
 2009: Musée de l'Élysée, Lausanne, Switzerland
 2009: Cité de la Musique, Paris, France
 2010: Musée Nicéphore Niépce, Chalon-sur-Saône, France
 2010: Montreal Museum of Fine Arts, Montreal, Canada
 2011: Serviço Social do Comércio de São Paulo, Brazil
 2012: Santa Barbara Museum of Art, Santa Barbara, CA USA
 2014: Annenberg Space for Photography, Los Angeles, CA USA
 2015: Forest Lawn Museum, Los Angeles, CA USA

Notable subjects

Entertainment

Music

Politics
 Pat Brown
 Dwight Eisenhower
 Barry Goldwater
 Lyndon Johnson
 John F. Kennedy
 Robert F. Kennedy
 Richard Nixon
 Sam Rayburn
 Nelson Rockefeller
 Eleanor Roosevelt
 Pierre Salinger
 Adlai Stevenson
 Harry Truman
 Sam Yorty

Art/literature
 Marc Chagall
 Norman Cousins
 Christopher Isherwood
 Robinson Jeffers
 Louis L'Amour
 Norman Mailer
 Carl Sandburg
 Upton Sinclair
 Irving Wallace
 Jake Zeitlin

Sports
 Muhammad Ali
 Jim Brown
 Otis Chandler
 Don Drysdale
 Leo Durocher
 Sandy Koufax
 Willie Mays
 O. J. Simpson
 Y. A. Tittle

Industry
 Albert V. Casey, publisher of the Los Angeles Times
 Stuart Davis, CEO, Great Western Savings
 Henry Dreyfuss, industrial designer
 J. Paul Getty, industrialist
 Louis Lundborg, Chairman, Bank of America
 Dr. Linus Pauling, chemist; peace activist
 Norton Simon, chairman, Hunt Foods; industrialist
 Ted Turner, media mogul

See also
Saxon, W., "Leigh Wiener, 62, Photographer Of the Famous and the Historic", New York Times, May 14, 1993

Oliver, M., "Leigh A. Wiener; Nationally Known Photographer", Los Angeles Times, May 14, 1993

Ride, P., "Obituary: Leigh Wiener", The Independent, May 22, 1993 

"Living Memories From The Last Days Of Alcatraz", National Public Radio, March 31, 2013

Freedman, Wayne, "Alcatraz Marks 50 Years Since Closure", KGO-TV, March 21, 2013

References

External links
 Leigh Wiener Official Website
 Leigh Wiener at Craig Krull Gallery

American photojournalists
1993 deaths
1929 births
University of California, Los Angeles alumni
Deaths from skin disease
20th-century American photographers